Ahmadabad Rural District is a rural district (dehestan) in Hasanabad District, Eqlid County, Fars Province, Iran. At the 2006 census, its population was 5,003, in 1,152 families.  The rural district has 13 villages.

References 

Rural Districts of Fars Province
Eqlid County